The city of Tampere, the second largest city and urban area of Finland after Helsinki, can be divided into various sorts of subdivisions. The subdivisions include neighbourhoods, districts, major districts and postal code areas. The plethora of different official ways to divide the city is a source of some confusion to the inhabitants, as different kinds of subdivisions often share similar or identical names.

Districts

List of Tampere districts and quarters 

 1 Tampere central major district
 Keskusta (Tampere Centre)
 Finlayson
 Nalkala
 Amuri
 Kaakinmaa
 Pyynikinrinne
 Särkänniemi
 Tampella
 Jussinkylä
 Kyttälä
 Ratina
 Osmonmäki
 Tammela
 Tulli
 Kalevanharju
 Hatanpää
 Pyynikki
 Sampo
 Kalevanrinne
 Liisankallio
 Petsamo
 Lappi
 Lapinniemi
 Kaleva
 Järvensivu
 Vuohenoja
 Kauppi
 Kissanmaa
 Iides
 Viinikka
 Nekala
 Vihioja
 Jokipohja
 Muotiala
 2 Tampere northeastern major district
 Messu
 Uusikylä
 Ruotula
 Huikas
 Takahuhti
 Hakametsä
 Ristinarkku
 Aakkula
 Messukylä
 Pappila
 Tasa
 Niihama
 Atala
 Ojala
 Kumpula
 Tasanne
 Olkahinen
 Leino
 Linnainmaa
 Leinola
 Holvasti
 Vehmainen
 Hankkio
 3 Tampere southeastern major district
 Kauka
 Turtola
 Viiala
 Haihara
 Kaukajärvi
 Lukonmäki
 Hallila
 Herva
 Hervanta
 Rusko
 Hervantajärvi
 4 Tampere southern major district
 Härmä
 Härmälä
 Sarankulma
 Rantaperkiö
 Koivisto
 Rautaharkko
 Taatala Koivistonkylä Veisu Korkinmäki Nirva Peltoo
 Lakalaiva Peltolammi Multisilta Vuores Lahdesjärvi 5 Tampere southwestern major district
 Pispala
 Hyhky Ylä-Pispala Tahmela Ala-Pispala Santalahti Raho
 Epilä Kaarila Villilä Kalkku Rahola Tesoma
 Epilänharju Tohloppi Haukiluoma Lamminpää Myllypuro Ikuri Ristimäki Tesomajärvi 6 Tampere northwestern major district
 Liela
 Lielahti Pohtola Lintulampi Niemenranta Ryydynpohja Lentävä
 Niemi Lentävänniemi 7 Tampere northern major district
 Aito
 Nurmi Sorila Aitoniemi Kämmen
 Kämmenniemi Viitapohja Terä
 Polso Terälahti Velaatta''
 8 Other Tampere district
 Taraste
 Hiedanranta

See also 
 Subdivisions of Helsinki

Sources

External links 
Tampereen tilastoalueet - Paikkatietopalvelu (in Finnish)
Tampere alueittain; Tampereen kaupunki 2013 (in Finnish)
Karttapalvelu; Tampere.fi (karttataso: hallinnolliset yksiköt / tilastoalueet) (in Finnish)
Tilastoalueittainen väestöhistoria, Oskari - Kartat.tampere.fi (in Finnish)

Tampere